Enu or Ximoluo is a Hanoish language of the Bi-Ka branch spoken by 14,000 people of the Hani ethnic group. It is spoken in the counties of Mojiang, Jiangcheng, and Luchun in Yunnan, China.

Distribution
Ximoluo is spoken mostly in Yayi Township (雅邑乡), south-central Mojiang County, where most of the locals are classified as ethnic Hani, Han, Yi, and Dai. There are more than 8,000 Ximoluo people in Yayi Township, in the villages of Yayi (雅邑), Xuka (徐卡), Nanwen (南温), Zuoxi (座细), and Nanniwan (南泥湾), and also smaller numbers in Xialuopu (下洛浦), Baga (巴嘎), and Bali (坝利).

References

Works cited

 

Southern Loloish languages
Languages of China